The women's individual recurve archery event at the 2019 Pan American Games was held from 7 August to 11 August at the Villa María del Triunfo sports complex in Lima, Peru. One of eight archery events as part of the 2019 Pan American catalogue of sports, it was the eleventh time the women's individual recurve competition had been contested at the Games. Thirty-two archers from fourteen nations qualified for the event.

The defending champion from the 2015 Pan American Games was Khatuna Lorig of United States. Lorig was defeated in her bid to become a back-to-back Pan American champion in the final by Mexico's Alejandra Valencia, who triumphed in five sets to win the gold medal for the second time, reclaiming the title she had previously won in 2011. Lorig finished with the silver medal, with Casey Kaufhold of the United States winning the bronze medal ahead of Colombia's Ana Rendón.

One qualification spot for the women's individual event at the 2020 Summer Olympics was available to the nation of the highest-ranked archer which had not already qualified for the Olympic Games. As Mexico and the United States had already achieved qualification spots prior to the conclusion of the event, the position went to Colombia through Rendón's fourth-place finish.

Background

Qualification

A total of thirty-two qualification spots were available for the competition. Twenty-four places were reserved for the eight nations each entering the maximum berth of three archers through qualification for the women's team recurve event. The remaining eight places were available for the individuals of nations that had not already achieved a qualification spot. As host nation, Peru automatically qualified one individual place. Qualification was earned through two tournaments, the Pan American Archery Championships held in August 2018 in Medellin, Colombia and a secondary tournament held in Santiago, Chile in April 2019. Chile, Colombia, Bolivia, Brazil, Mexico, and the United States each qualified a team of three archers from the 2018 Pan American Archery Championships, Bolivia achieving qualification places in the women's archery event for the first time. Canada and Cuba later secured maximum berths at the Santiago tournament the following year, with Peru adding a second entry to their sole automatic qualifying spot. Six other nations additionally secured at least one qualification place over the two tournaments.

Khatuna Lorig, the defending champion from the Toronto Games four years previously, successfully qualified through the United States national team selection alongside newcomers Erin Mickelberry and 15-year-old Casey Kaufhold, with 2016 Summer Olympics competitor Mackenzie Brown as the reserve. Aída Román and Mariana Avitia, silver and bronze medalists at the 2012 Summer Olympics, were selected alongside Alejandra Valencia to form the Mexican team, the trio entering as the three highest ranked archers competing in the Games, Valencia the highest at world number 10. The host nation's team of two archers included the reigning Peruvian national champion Aleska Burga García. The inclusion of Graziela Paulino dos Santos within the Brazilian team marked the first time an indigenous Brazilian athlete was selected to compete at the Pan American Games.

Format

The women's individual was an outdoor recurve target archery event held to the World Archery-approved rules. Archers shot at a 122 cm-wide target from a distance of 70 metres, with between one and ten points awarded for each arrow depending on how close it landed to the centre of the target. The competition consisted of three stages spread over five days: an initial ranking round, four elimination rounds, and two finals matches, which decided the winners of the gold, silver, and bronze medals. In the ranking round, each of the 32 archers entering the competition shot a total of 72 arrows. The total score of each archer was used to seed the archers into the following four-round single-elimination tournament, the number one seed going to the highest-scoring archer.

The elimination rounds used the Archery Olympic Round set system introduced at the 2012 Summer Olympics. Each match consisted of a maximum of five sets, with archers each shooting three arrows per set. The archer with the highest score from their three arrows, for a maximum of 30, won the set, earning two set points. The archer with the lowest score in each set received zero points. If the score was tied, each archer received one point. The first archer to reach six set points was declared the winner. If the match was tied at five set points each after the maximum five sets were played, a single tie-breaker arrow was used with the archer shooting closest to centre of the target winning.

Schedule

Report
Alejandra Valencia topped the ranking round on the opening day of the competition with a new continental and Pan American Games record of 675 points, finishing thirteen points clear of Casey Kaufhold, whose total of 662 was a personal best, and twenty-two points clear of third-placed Aída Román. Defending champion Lorig placed sixth on 642 points.

Elimination rounds
The beginning of the elimination rounds on 8 August saw Bolivia's debut in the women's individual event come to a premature end, with Ebe Fernandez, Dhara Claros, and Ana Micaela Espinoza Garcia all losing in the 1/16 elimination round in straight sets. Chile's three entrants also suffered early exits. Isabella Bassi, the highest-placed Chilean archer in the ranking round, and Javier Andrades both lost in the opening round, the former falling to Guatemala's Cinthya Pellecer after shooting an eight to Pellecer's nine in a one-arrow shoot-off. Only Catalina Márquez Rojas of Chile's trio advanced beyond the first round after ending as the surprise victor in her encounter against ninth-seed Elizabeth Rodriguez of Cuba. She would later bow out after defeat to Erin Mickelberry in the second round. Brazil's three entries also fared poorly, with Graziela Paulino dos Santos losing in the opening 1/16 elimination round and Ane Marcelle dos Santos and Ana Sliatchicas Caetano departing shortly afterwards in the 1/8 elimination round. Caio Fiusa of Lance! subsequently described the day as "not a happy Thursday" for Brazilian archery.

The quarter-finals, which followed into the afternoon of 8 August, featured seven of the eight top seeds. Of the highest-placed archers from the ranking round only the seventh seed, Canada's Stephanie Barrett, failed to reach the last eight, having lost to Maira Sepulveda of Colombia - who finished 26th the previous day - in the 1/16 elimination round. The first quarter-final contest saw top seed Valencia defeat Erin Mickelberry in a one-arrow shoot-off after tying on five set points each, advancing to the semi-finals as the sole Mexican left in the competition; both of Valencia's teammates were eliminated in the following quarter-final contests, Román losing to Lorig and Avitia being defeated by fourth-seed Ana Rendón. Pellecer, the lowest seeded archer to progress to the quarter-finals, lost to Kaufhold in straight sets in the final quarter-final match. The progression of both Lorig and Kaufhold to the semi-finals, along with the successful American showing in the team events, marked the United States archery team's strongest international performance of the year.

Finals
After a two-day break the competition resumed on Sunday, 11 August for the two semi-final and the two medal-deciding matches. Valencia defeated Rendón in straight sets to advance to the gold medal final against Lorig, who defeated her younger teammate in an all-American second semi-final. As the two losing semifinalists, Rendón and Kaufhold went on to contest the third-placed match for the bronze medal. In a straight sets victory Kaufhold emerged victorious, her bronze medal earning her a third of the Games after earlier gold medal victories in the women's team and mixed team events.

In Valencia and Lorig the gold medal final pitted the 2011 and 2015 Pan American champions against one another. After three sets Valencia and Lorig were tied, but two near-perfect scores of 29 in the fourth and fifth sets was enough for the Mexican to pull ahead, winning by seven set points to Lorig's three. Valencia's win earned her a second Pan American individual gold medal and her third medal overall of the 2019 Games. Speaking after her victory Valencia said she enjoyed the match and was able to recover from some mistakes, adding "Let’s pretend Toronto didn’t happen as I didn’t make the finals there... I shot well today and the results followed." Ricardo Gutierrez of Yahoo! Deportes praised her style of play, writing that she showed "mettle, concentration, and definition in her shots" in overcoming the more experienced Lorig.

Valencia's win was Mexico's sole victory in the archery competitions of the 2019 Pan American Games and the nation's 37th gold medal of the Games, its highest Pan American tally away from home.

Results

Ranking round

Elimination rounds

Top half

Bottom half

Note: An asterisk (*) denotes a win from a one-arrow shoot-off 
Source:

Finals

Source:

See also
Archery at the 2018 Asian Games – Women's individual recurve
Archery at the 2019 European Games – Women's individual recurve
Archery at the 2020 Summer Olympics – Women's individual

References

External links
Archery at the Official Lima 2019 website

Archery at the 2019 Pan American Games
Women's events at the 2019 Pan American Games
2019 in women's archery